The Glow is the seventh album by Bonnie Raitt, released in 1979. It was one of the first albums to be recorded and mixed digitally.

Track listing
"I Thank You" (Isaac Hayes, David Porter) – 2:51
"Your Good Thing (Is About to End)" (Isaac Hayes, David Porter) – 4:00
"Standin' by the Same Old Love" (Raitt) – 4:10
"Sleep's Dark and Silent Gate" (Jackson Browne) – 3:25
"The Glow" (Veyler Hildebrand) – 4:11
"Bye Bye Baby" (Mary Wells) – 3:17
"The Boy Can't Help It" (Bobby Troup) – 3:39
"(I Could Have Been Your) Best Old Friend" (Andy McMahon, Tracy Nelson) – 2:52
"You're Gonna Get What's Coming" (Robert Palmer) – 3:32
"(Goin') Wild for You Baby" (David Batteau, Tom Snow) – 5:25

Personnel
As listed in liner notes:
 Bonnie Raitt – lead vocals, slide electric guitar (3, 8), National steel guitar (7)
 Danny Kortchmar – electric guitar (1-4, 6, 7, 9), backing vocals (7)
 Waddy Wachtel – electric guitar (1, 3, 4, 6-10), harmony vocals (3), backing vocals (7)
 Bill Payne – acoustic piano (1-4), electric piano (8, 10), Oberheim synthesizer (9, 10)
 Don Grolnick – acoustic piano (5)
 Bob Glaub – bass (1-4, 6, 7, 9, 10)
 Bob Magnusson – bass (5)
 Freebo – bass (8)
 Rick Marotta – drums (1-4, 6-10), cowbell (1), percussion (6, 7, 8)
 John Guerin – drums (5)
 Larry Williams – saxophone (2)
 Trevor Lawrence – saxophone (2)
 David Sanborn – alto saxophone solo (2)
 Steve Madaio – trumpet (2)
 Paul Butterfield – harmonica (6)
 Rosemary Butler – backing vocals (1, 9)
 Kenny Edwards – backing vocals (1, 4, 9)
 Maxayn Lewis – backing vocals (1, 9)
 J.D. Souther – backing vocals (1, 9)
 Craig Fuller – backing vocals (4)
 Peter Asher – backing vocals (7)

Production
 Producer – Peter Asher
 Recorded and Mixed by Val Garay
 Assistant Engineers – Niko Bolas and George Ybarra
 Recorded and Mixed at The Sound Factory (Hollywood, CA).
 Mastered by Doug Sax at The Mastering Lab (Los Angeles).
 Art Direction and Design – John Kosh 
 Cover Photo – David Alexander
 Sleeve Photos – Jim Shea

Charts
Album - Billboard (United States)

Singles - Billboard (United States)

References

Bonnie Raitt albums
1979 albums
Albums produced by Peter Asher
Warner Records albums